Mis-Teeq: Greatest Hits is a greatest hits compilation album released by Mis-Teeq. The album was released months after their disbandment in February 2005. The compilation included fourteen songs previously seen on their first two albums, Lickin' on Both Sides and Eye Candy, and one new track, a cover of The Andrews Sisters song "Shoo Shoo Baby", which was released as the official song of the 2005 Disney film Valiant.

Track listing

Charts

References

External links 

2005 greatest hits albums
Mis-Teeq albums
Universal Records compilation albums